John Patrick Johnson (born June 10, 1972) is a former American football defensive back who played for the Miami Dolphins in the National Football League (NFL). He played college football at Purdue University, and was also a member of the Atlanta Falcons and Green Bay Packers.

College career 
Johnson played college football for the Purdue Boilermakers, and was named by the Journal and Courier as the best player with number 29 in school history.

Professional career 
Later that year he joined the Miami Dolphins, but was released in preseason.

Johnson returned to the Miami Dolphins in 1995. He played 14-of-16 games of the season. In week 17 against the St. Louis Rams, Johnson returned a fumble for a 37-yard touchdown in the fourth quarter, securing the victory.

In 1996, Johnson was claimed off waivers by the Green Bay Packers, but was later released.

References

Further reading
 

1972 births
Living people
American football defensive backs
Purdue Boilermakers football players
Miami Dolphins players